Thorn is a hamlet located in the Central Bedfordshire district of Bedfordshire, England.

The settlement is located to the north of Bidwell and Houghton Regis, and to the south of Wingfield and Chalgrave.

Hamlets in Bedfordshire
Central Bedfordshire District